The Beautiful Girl is a 1969 (Soviet) Lithuanian film directed by Arūnas Žebriūnas.

Cast 
 Inga Mickytė - Inga
 Lilija Žadeikytė - Inga's Mother
 Sergey Martinson - Lonely Old Man
 Arvydas Samukas - Viktoras
 Tauras Ragalevičius - The New One

References

External links 

1969 drama films
1969 films
Soviet drama films
Soviet-era Lithuanian films
Lithuanian drama films